David Bolt was Independent Chief Inspector of Borders and Immigration from 2015 to 2021.

He graduated from the University of East Anglia with a BA Comparative Literature and Russian Language in 1976. During his degree he spent time studying at Voronezh State University. A former MI5 officer, he previously held the positions of Deputy Director General of the National Criminal Intelligence Service, Executive Director of Intelligence at the Serious Organised Crime Agency and Chief Executive of the International Federation of Spirits Producers.

References

Year of birth missing (living people)
Living people
Alumni of the University of East Anglia
MI5 personnel
Place of birth missing (living people)
British civil servants
United Kingdom border control
Voronezh State University alumni
21st-century British civil servants